Ana Vanesa Rial (born 1 March 1982) is a Spanish rugby sevens player. She competed for Spain in rugby sevens at the 2016 Summer Olympics. She was a member of their squad who were victorious and secured the last spot at the Rio Olympics. In 2013, she was selected for Spain's Sevens World Cup squad.

References

External links 
 

1982 births
Living people
Spain international women's rugby sevens players
Olympic rugby sevens players of Spain
Rugby sevens players at the 2016 Summer Olympics
People from O Barbanza
Sportspeople from the Province of A Coruña